Hilder is a surname. Notable people with the surname include:

Alan Hilder (1901–1970), English cricketer
Anthony J. Hilder, American film maker, conspiracy expert and radio host
J J Hilder (1881–1916), Australian Watercolourist
Matt Hilder (born 1982), Australian rugby league footballer
Robert Hilder (born 1949), Third Judicial District Court Judge in the U.S. state of Utah
Rowland Hilder (1905–1993), English marine and landscape artist and book illustrator